is a rugby union player who plays at wing or occasionally full back for Canon Eagles. He previously played for Suntory Sungoliath and the Japan national rugby union team. Nicknamed "the eel" for his sharp sidestepping ability, Onozawa is the second most capped Japanese rugby player of all time, and fifth highest try scorer in international rugby. Despite spending much of his career in the shadow of Daisuke Ohata he is considered an all-time great of Japanese rugby in his own right.

Career 

Onozawa made his debut for Japan against  in June 2001 and immediately impressed troubling the Welsh defence throughout and scored a try from 75 metres out from a move that he started himself. From there onwards he became a fixture in the Japan side.

He scored 8 tries in his first 7 caps playing at full back, but in 2003 moved to a spot on the wing. He played all of Japan's matches at the 2003 Rugby World Cup, scoring in his first match against  and his wing partnership with Daisuke Ohata at the tournament was noted as one of the most positive aspects of Japan's tournament.

In the 2007 Rugby World Cup, Onozawa again played in all Japan's matches and notably scored a 70-metre individual try against . Over the next few years, Onozawa gradually kept increasing his try scoring record and by 2011 he entered the top 10 on the all time international try scoring list.

At the 2011 Rugby World Cup, Onozawa played in all Japan's matches for a third consecutive tournament, and also scored against  to become the 15th player to score in a three World Cups.

Into his 12th year of his international career in 2013, Onozawa won his 80th cap against  to become the most capped Japanese player of all time, overtaking centre Yukio Motoki's total of 79 caps. However he suffered with persistent injuries, including a long term shoulder injury which brought his international career effectively to a close with younger players coming through. He still was thought of in high regard by Eddie Jones though, who kept Onozawa with the squad in a mentoring role.

At domestic level, Onozawa played for 14 years with Suntory Sungoliath, before joining Canon Eagles in 2014 to finish his career. With Suntory Sungoliath he won the Top League three times, was the league's leading try scorer in the 2009/10 and 2010/11 seasons, was named in the team of the season 8 times at the end of season awards, and was named the league's overall MVP for the 2007/08 season. In October 2012, Onozawa became the first player to score 100 tries in the Top League.

References

External links
 
 
 RWC 2007 profile
 RWC 2011 profile

1978 births
Living people
Japanese rugby union players
Rugby union wings
Japan international rugby union players
Tokyo Sungoliath players
Yokohama Canon Eagles players
Male rugby sevens players
Asian Games medalists in rugby union
Rugby union players at the 2002 Asian Games
Asian Games silver medalists for Japan
Medalists at the 2002 Asian Games
Japan international rugby sevens players